Rye High School is a public high school in Rye, New York. Rye High School is the only high school in the Rye City School District. It shares a building with Rye Middle School.

History
The school is accredited by the New York State Department of Education and the Middle States Association. The school is ranked the 96th best high school in the US according to Newsweek's Ranking of the top 500 high schools in the US as of 2015.

Due to the abundance of garnets discovered during construction of the school, this precious gem became the adopted mascot.

Campus
The High School itself was built during the Great Depression, as part of a public works project aimed at giving people work. Rye High School is designed in the style of Gothic architecture, constructed with dark stones, small recessed windows, and sloping roofs.

The High School is connected to Rye Middle School. Several Rye Middle School classes are hosted in the High School and about 1/3 of middle school students use the high school cafeteria at any given time, rotating every third of the school year.

A $17 million initiative helped modernize the school by constructing a new science wing adjacent to the auxiliary gym on the north end of the campus. The new building contains twelve labs, workrooms, and numerous new facilities, among other things. The project was completed in 2015.

The campus hosts a football stadium with an outdoor track and spots for field events to be conducted, a baseball/softball field, practice fields for various sports (including lacrosse, soccer, field hockey and cross country), a small brook separating the field from the rest of the school, parking lots, grassy fields, and a few trees.

Curriculum
A graduation requirement of 60 hours of community service was implemented in 1989.
 
Though not a curricular requirement, as much as 89 percent of the student body participates in Advanced Placement (AP) courses. During the month of May, the school essentially shuts down while AP's are administered to students. Afterwards, students receive a five-day break from classes for their efforts. Unlike many other high schools, AP World and AP European History is offered to students in the tenth grade, as opposed to only being offered in eleventh grade. This distinction allows students to essentially "try out" AP courses so they can gauge their ability to handle the heavy workload.

At graduation, many students have taken at least one Advanced Placement course, with some students taking in upwards of fifteen of these courses. In addition, several honors courses and one college credit class are offered to students who wish to challenge themselves academically. Recently the school has adopted a new focus on STEAM courses. The most recent example is the addition of the AP Computer Principles course, which ran for the first time in the 2018–2019 school year.

Graduation requirements
In order to receive a diploma from Rye High School, a student must meet several criteria by the time of graduation. These include, but are not limited to:

 Complete 60+ hours of community service
 Have taken 3+ years of foreign language
 Have taken a Participation in Government class
 Have taken an Economics class
 Have 4 or more English credits
 Have 4 or more History credits
 Have at least 1 Art credit
 Have 3 or more Science credits
 Have 3 or more Math credits

Athletics

Rye High School fields teams in baseball, softball, basketball, cheer-leading, cross country, crew, field hockey, football, rugby, golf, gymnastics, ice hockey, lacrosse, sailing, soccer, swimming, tennis, track and field, volleyball, and wrestling. The football team has won 3 state championships including 2 in a row (2007, 2008), and the basketball team won its league with a 17–6 record in 2009 and went to the Westchester County Center. The sailing team won the state championship in 2017 and the region's team race championship.

Hazing
Rye High School students had an underground tradition, well known by students and alumni, known as "Freshman Friday." In mid-2012, three Rye High School students were charged with kidnapping three freshmen, taking them to a remote location and hazing them, with one student requiring hospital treatment. The school repeatedly denied any knowledge of the event, despite the fact that many teachers interviewed about the incident did admit that they had knowledge of the event well before the proceedings occurred. After several adjournments, in October 2012 the felony assault charges against the three students were reduced to misdemeanor counts of hazing and unlawful imprisonment, with subsequent proceedings closed.

Notable alumni
Alumni of Rye High School include:

References

External links
Rye High School

Public high schools in Westchester County, New York
Buildings and structures in Rye, New York